Marcela Ivón Rodezno Hernández (born 8 January 1985) is a Salvadoran former professional tennis player.

Tennis career
Rodezno made her Fed Cup debut for El Salvador in 2000. She won three gold medals at the 2001 Central American Games and a bronze medal at the 2002 Central American and Caribbean Games. In 2003 she represented El Salvador at the Pan American Games in Santo Domingo and made the quarter-finals of the doubles. She continued to play in the Fed Cup until 2004, for a total of 15 ties, from which she won eight singles and four doubles rubbers.

Between 2004 and 2008 she played collegiate tennis for South Carolina State University.

In 2020 she won the national doubles championships for American platform tennis.

Personal life
Rodezno was born and raised in La Libertad.

In 2010 she married Romanian Johnny Hurduc and they live with their two children in the United States.

ITF finals

Doubles: 1 (0–1)

References

External links
 
 
 

1985 births
Living people
Salvadoran female tennis players
South Carolina State Bulldogs and Lady Bulldogs athletes
People from La Libertad Department (El Salvador)
Central American Games gold medalists for El Salvador
Competitors at the 2002 Central American and Caribbean Games
Central American and Caribbean Games medalists in tennis
Central American and Caribbean Games bronze medalists for El Salvador
Tennis players at the 2003 Pan American Games
Pan American Games competitors for El Salvador
College women's tennis players in the United States
21st-century Salvadoran women